Crokicurl is a Canadian winter sport invented by Liz Wreford and Leanne Muir of Public City Architecture in 2016 and first played in Winnipeg, Canada. The game is a large scale hybrid of curling and the board game Crokinole.

The related game of crokinole is a game in which the players take turn to flick small discs on a circular board, to score highest depending on where the disc lands on the board where the regions are marked with score.

Play and rules
In crokicurl, rocks are used instead of discs and its rocks are roughly the size of a curling stone. The game uses junior curling stones which are 25 lbs instead of 38 - 44 lbs for regular curling stones.

The game is played by teams consisting of two players, trying to score points by throwing the stones into the center of the ice where the circles are marked. The highest circle is marked with twenty points.

Locations
Crokicurl has spread from Winnipeg all across Canada to small towns and large cities. A list is included below.

 Saskatoon
 Calgary
 Regina
 Kenora, ON
 Guelph
 Penetanguishene & Midland, ON
 Wiikwemkoong
 Ramara
 Toronto,
 Fort St. John

 Gull Lake, Saskatchewan
 Melfort, Saskatchewan
 Binscarth
 Sylvan Lake, Alberta
 Hanna, Alberta
 Prince Albert, Saskatchewan
 Estevan
 Neepawa
 Yorkton
 Swift Current

 Shellbrook
 Weyburn
 Centre-Ville de Kénogami
 Saguenay, Quebec

 Deep River, Ontario
 McKenzie_Lake_(Madawaska_River)
 Cobden, Ontario
 Cornwall, Prince Edward Island
 La Ronge
 Morden, Manitoba
 Crowsnest Pass, Alberta
 Cypress River, Manitoba

America
The first American rink created, and contested national championship, was on Valentine's Day weekend 2021 in Altoona, Wisconsin.

References

External links
 Saguenay

Ice sports
Curling in Canada
Sports originating in Canada